Fahreta Živojinović (born 20 October 1960), known by her stage name Lepa Brena, is a Yugoslav singer, actress, and businesswoman. She is the best-selling female recording artist from the former Yugoslavia. She is often credited with creating the turbo-folk genre with her first two albums Čačak, Čačak (1982) and Mile voli disko (1982).

Lepa Brena grew up in Brčko, Bosnia and Herzegovina, but has lived in Belgrade, Serbia since 1980, where she started her career. Lepa Brena is considered to be a symbol of the former Yugoslavia, due to the fact that she was one of the last popular acts to emerge before the breakup of the country. She has described herself as being "Yugo-nostalgic". Along with her husband, Slobodan Živojinović and friend, Saša Popović, Brena co-founded and co-owned Grand Production, the biggest record label and production company in the Balkans. In 2019, they decided to sell Grand Production for €30 million.

Early life
Born into a Muslim family in the outskirts of Tuzla, PR Bosnia and Herzegovina, she grew up in Brčko as the youngest child of Abid Jahić ( – 22 October 2010) and Ifeta (15 April 1934 – 21 November 2014). Both of her parents are originally from villages near Srebrenik; her father was born in Ježinac and her maternal family hailed from Ćehaje. Fahreta grew up in a Muslim home with sister Faketa and brother Faruk. At the start of the Bosnian War in 1992, her sister Faketa emigrated to Canada, where she lives today, while Brena stayed in Belgrade where she had been living since 1980.

Her first performance for an audience was in the fifth grade at a local festival, singing a Kemal Monteno song named "Sviraj mi o njoj". She later reflected, "It was the only time in my life that I've ever experienced stage fright." Afterwards, she started performing regularly at dance parties in Brčko.

While a guest on a Croatian television show in March 2014, she was asked if she had been ashamed of having a Muslim name, to which she replied: "Why would I be ashamed? I was and stay what I am. Today I am Fahreta. I am proud of my parents and roots". She said of her stage name, that Brena was given to her by her basketball coach Vlado, while the epithet Lepa was given to her by showman Minimaks.

Career

1980–1983: Slatki Greh and career beginnings
In early 1980, at the age of 19, Fahreta began singing with a band called Lira Show when the group's original singer Spasa left the band because her husband, a boxer, did not want his wife to be a singer. Saša Popović, the band's frontman, was initially opposed to the idea that Fahreta should be the band's new singer, but later changed his opinion. She subsequently moved to Novi Sad and then to Belgrade. Brena's first performance with Lira Show occurred on 6 April 1980 in the hotel Turist in Bačka Palanka. Lira Show changed their name to Slatki Greh (Sweet Sin) in 1981. Brena and Slatki Greh premiered their first studio album, Čačak, Čačak, on 3 February 1982. The album was written mostly by Milutin Popović-Zahar, and the career-manager was Vladimir Cvetković.

Since her career began in 1980, she has become arguably the most popular singer of the former Yugoslavia, and a top-selling female recording artist with more than 40 million records sold.
The same year Lepa Brena and Slatki Greh appeared in the first part of Yugoslav classic comedy film A Tight Spot with popular comedian Nikola Simić and actress Ružica Sokić, which raised their status and brought them almost instant fame. They would again team up with songwriter Milutin Popović-Zahar for their second studio album Mile voli disko (Mile Loves Disco), released 18 November 1982. In addition to the title song, the album had a couple of other hit songs: "Duge noge" ("Long Legs") and "Dama iz Londona" ("London Lady").

In 1983, Lepa Brena and Slatki Greh ended their collaboration with Milutin Popović-Zahar and Vladimir Cvetković. That same year Lepa Brena and Slatki Greh participated in Jugovizija, the Yugoslav selection for the Eurovision Song Contest, with the song "Sitnije, Cile, sitnije". The song was released on an extended play of the same name, along with another song. Their appearance on Jugovizija caused controversy, since the competition was traditionally dominated exclusively by pop artists, and Lepa Brena belonged to a totally different music genre, which was folk-pop, or also called novokomponovana muzika. Although they did not qualify for the prestigious European competition, Lepa Brena and Slatki Greh won the contest, gaining even more popularity.

1984–1990: Bato, Bato and Hajde da se volimo
1984 saw Brena and her band begin a cooperation with a new manager and producer, Raka Đokić. Bato, Bato (Brother, Brother), their third album, was released the same year. A new provocative image was accompanied by a new musical style, different from the one fostered by Popović. Later that year, they held a concert in neighboring Romania, at the stadium in Timișoara to an audience of 65,000, what was at time among the most successful concerts of a Yugoslav musician outside their home country.

Their next three albums, Pile moje (My Little One, 1985) and Voli me, voli (Love Me, Love) and Uske pantalone (Tight Trousers, both 1986) would propel her to the throne of the Yugoslav music scene. Along with these albums, Brena established a cooperation with Serbian folk star Miroslav Ilić and recorded a collaborative extended play Jedan dan života (One Day of Life), which featured four songs, including a romantic duet called "Jedan dan života", and the song "Živela Jugoslavija" (Long Live Yugoslavia), which was received with a mixed response. The latter song was in line with Brena's only official political stance: an uncompromising support of a united Yugoslavia, with her becoming a symbol of this view. By the end of 1986, Lepa Brena had become the star of Belgrade social jet-set, and the most popular public figure in Yugoslavia.

Brena's manager Raka Đokić came up with the idea that her seventh studio album should be followed by a film in which she would play the lead role. This idea was successfully implemented in 1987 when the motion picture Hajde da se volimo (Let's Love Each Other) was filmed. The film shared the name with the album. Many then-popular Yugoslav actors co-starred in the film, including Dragomir "Gidra" Bojanić, Milutin "Mima" Karadžić, Velimir "Bata" Živojinović, Milan Štrljić, etc. During the premiere of the film on 24 October 1987, Brena met her future husband, Serbian tennis star Slobodan Živojinović.

Based on the success of the original, two sequels were produced: Hajde da se volimo 2 (1989) and Hajde da se volimo 3 (1990), which was followed by the studio album Boli me uvo za sve (I Don't Care About Anything). Boli me uvo za sve also had multiple hit songs including "Čik pogodi" (Take a Guess), "Biće belaja" (There Will Be Trouble), "Tamba Lamba", and the title track. Their eighth studio album Četiri godine (Four Years) was released on 1 October 1989 and contained the controversial song Jugoslovenka (Yugoslav Woman) with Montenegrin vocalist Danijel Popović, Croatian vocalist Vlado Kalember and Bosnian vocalist Alen Islamović. The music video for the pop song "Čuvala me mama" (Mum Protected Me) was filmed on the Croatian island Lopud.

Lepa Brena and Slatki Greh held more than 350 concerts yearly, and would often hold two concerts in one day. They set a record by holding thirty-one concerts consecutively at Dom Sindikata, and seventeen concerts consecutively at the Sava Centar. On 24 July 1990, Brena landed with a helicopter at Vasil Levski National Stadium in Sofia, Bulgaria, and held a concert with an audience of 90,000 people. While she was in Bulgaria in July 1990, she met with the Bulgarian mystic Baba Vanga.

1991–1999: Ja nemam drugi dom and Grand Production

Brena and Slatki Greh released their second-to-last album together, Zaljubiška ( 'lovelysh'), in 1991.

In December 1993, after two-year hiatus, Brena premiered her first solo album Ja nemam drugi dom (I Have No Other Home), and held a famous "concert in the rain" on 13 June 1994 at Belgrade's Tašmajdan Sports Centre which was attended by 35,000 people. After that, she recorded two more solo albums: Kazna Božija (God's Punishment, 1994) and Luda za tobom (Crazy Over You, 1996). In the mid-90s she had many popular songs; "Kazna Božija", "Luda za tobom", "Sve mi dobro ide osim ljubavi" (I'm Good at Everything But Love), "Izdajice" (Traitor), "Moj se dragi Englez pravi" (My Man's Acting an Englishman), "I da odem iza leđa bogu" (Even If I Go Behind God's Back), "Ja nemam drugi dom", "Dva dana" (Two Days), and "Ti si moj greh" (You Are My Sin), among others. The music video for "Ti si moj greh" had an ancient Egyptian theme, with Brena dressed as a pharaoh.

Brena became co-founder of the Serbian record label Grand Production, which was formerly known as Zabava miliona (ZaM), in December 1998.

2000–2017: Pomračenje sunca, hiatus, and comeback

After her marriage in 1991, when she briefly moved to the United States, she ceased cooperation with Slatki Greh. However, in 2000 they recorded another album together Pomračenje sunca (Solar Eclipse), their last album to date. After eight years of absence from the music business, Lepa Brena returned with Uđi slobodno... (Feel Free to Enter..., 2008) and Začarani krug (Vicious Circle, 2011). Both albums were major successes.

Beginning in 2012, Brena started recording sessions for two studio albums. The first, Izvorne i novokomponovane narodne pesme (Original and Newly Composed Folk Songs) was released in December 2013. She dedicated the album to her ailing mother Ifeta, who sang folk songs to her when she was a child. Ifeta died the following year.

In the month after that album's release, Brena premiered two other songs: "Ljubav čuvam za kraj" (I'm Keeping Love For the End) on 28 December 2013 and "Zaljubljeni veruju u sve" (Those in Love Believe in Everything), with lyrics written by Hari Varešanović, on 12 January 2014.

On 19 December 2013, Brena, along with Dragana Mirković, Severina, Jelena Rozga, Haris Džinović, Aca Lukas and Jelena Karleuša, was a guest at a humanitarian concert by Goran Bregović at the Zetra Olympic Hall in the Bosnian capital city Sarajevo for the Roma in Bosnia and Herzegovina. Brena arrived in Sarajevo two days before the concert so that she could enjoy the city with friends before the concert. She said in an interview: "Sarajevo has suffered and survived so much, I'm really glad to see positive people and happiness in this city".

Lepa Brena and Steven Seagal were the stars of Belgrade 2016 New Year party, an event held at Nikola Pašić Square in front of the Serbian National Assembly, and attended by 60,000 people.

In December 2017, Brena published two new songs "Zar je važno da l' se pjeva ili peva" (Does It Matter Whether It's Sung (in Ijekavian) or Sung (in Ekavian)) and "Boliš i ne prolaziš" (You Hurt and You Don't Heal) as teasers for her new album expected to be published in the beginning of 2018.

Personal life
Her wedding to Serbian tennis star Slobodan Živojinović on 7 December 1991 was a media event throughout Yugoslavia. The lavish ceremony took place at Belgrade's InterContinental Hotel. The level of interest in the event was such that Brena's manager Raka Đokić released a VHS tape of the wedding. Their public relationship has been providing steady fodder for various tabloid publications ever since. Brena and Živojinović's first child, a son named Stefan, was born in New York City on 21 May 1992. Their second son Viktor was born 30 March 1998.

Brena broke her leg in a skiing accident in November 1992, and it took six months for her to heal. Her manager and producer Raka Đokić died suddenly on 30 October 1993.

On 23 November 2000, the couple's elder son Stefan was kidnapped by members of the Zemun mafia. After they paid a ransom of 2,500,000 Deutsche Marks in cash, he was released, having been held for five days. She has resided in Belgrade since 1980 and currently lives there with her husband, while their sons are studying in the United States. In a 2014 interview, she stated that she is still healing from the trauma of the kidnapping incident.

After the debacle and family drama, she went on hiatus once again, lasting eight years, living between Belgrade and Miami, Florida with her family. Brena and her husband have a home in Coconut Creek, Florida, where they lived during the 1999 NATO bombing of Yugoslavia, although Brena visited Yugoslavia during the bombing and took part on one of the public morale-raising concerts on Belgrade's Republic Square. She also has an apartment in Monte Carlo, French Riviera, and another townhouse on Fisher Island, also in Florida. In 2010, Brena and her husband purchased a five-bedroom villa with an in-ground heated pool on one of Miami's islands at a cost of $1.6 million.

In October 2010, her father, Abid Jahić, was severely injured when a bus hit him as he walked in the town of Brčko. He was transported to a hospital in Tuzla, where he died on 22 October 2010 aged 82. He was buried in a Muslim funeral three days after his death. Brena, her two siblings and mother, along with other family members and citizens of Brčko attended the funeral. She later regarded the months after her father's death as the emotionally most difficult time of her life. Her mother Ifeta died 21 November 2014, aged 80. She was buried in a Muslim funeral in Brčko next to her husband.

Brena was hospitalized on 27 July 2012 when she complained of pain and was diagnosed as having venous thrombosis, a blood clot. She remained in the hospital for three days, then was released. A similar incident had occurred in October 2004 when a blood clot in her hand was removed. In August 2012, she was forced to cancel three months of scheduled concerts to deal with further complications with her illness.

She was again hospitalized on 25 July 2014 while at holiday in the Croatian resort of Novi Vinodolski where she fell down the stairs and broke both arms. She was hospitalized for five days and spent her month-long recovery at a local hotel. On 2 January 2015, Brena fell down the stairs again during a family vacation at Zlatibor, Serbia, and hurt her wrist. Unlike the previous incident, this injury did not require surgery. However, because of this, she stayed hospitalized in Belgrade and rescheduled upcoming performances in the Bosnian towns Živinice and Travnik.

Controversy

During the late 1980s and early 1990s, ethnic tensions which started rising in Yugoslavia and eventually led to country's breakup, made Lepa Brena become one of main tabloid targets at the time. Some Bosniaks viewed her as a traitor as she was a Bosniak who sang and spoke with an Ekavian accent (which is predominantly spoken in Serbia) and she married Serbian Slobodan Živojinović. Several tabloids claimed that she had converted from Islam to Serbian Orthodoxy and that she had changed her name from Fahreta to Jelena. She intensely denied these allegations. In socialist Yugoslavia, religions in general were an unpopular topic, and people acknowledged the religion to which belonged in relation to its family roots, but were overwhelmingly non-practitioners. In that sense, being a Yugoslav icon, Lepa Brena never publicly spoke about her religious beliefs beyond stating that she had grown up being Sunni Muslim.

In 2009, numerous Bosniaks and Croats protested when her concerts in Sarajevo on 30 May and in Zagreb on 13 June were announced. The reason behind the protests were pictures allegedly shot in 1993 during the Bosnian War in which she appears wearing the uniform of the Army of Republika Srpska in the besieged town of Brčko, where she grew up. In the pictures, taken and published by one Serbian magazine, she appears giving support to Bosnian Serb soldiers, which were at that time involved in intense fighting against Croatian and Bosniak forces in Posavina front. This is why Croatian and Bosnian protesters were angered calling her a "traitor" and a "". The concerts went ahead as scheduled with no incidents and she claimed the uniform was from the set of a 1990 music video for her song "Tamba lamba", in which she wore a similar uniform while filming at a zoo in Kenya for the film Hajde da se volimo 3. However, when compared side by side, the uniforms are different. Brena also claimed she was only in Brčko in 1993 to rescue her parents.

Discography

Studio albums

Čačak, Čačak (1982)
Mile voli disko (1982)
Bato, Bato (1984)
Pile moje (1984)
Voli me, voli (1986)
Uske pantalone (1986)
Hajde da se volimo (1987)
Četiri godine (1989)
Boli me uvo za sve (1990)
Zaljubiška (1991)
Ja nemam drugi dom (1993)
Kazna Božija (1994)
Luda za tobom (1996)
Pomračenje sunca (2000)
Uđi slobodno... (2008)
Začarani krug (2011)
Izvorne i novokomponovane narodne pesme (2013)
Zar je važno dal se peva ili pjeva (2018)

Extended plays
Sitnije, Cile, sitnije (1983)
Jedan dan života  (with Miroslav Ilić) (1985)

Compilations
Lepa Brena & Slatki Greh (1990)
Lepa Brena (The Best of – Dupli CD) (2003)
Lepa Brena (HITOVI – 6 CD-a) (2016)

Filmography

Film
Tesna koža (1982)
Nema problema (1984)
Kamiondžije ponovo voze (1984)
Hajde da se volimo (1987)
Hajde da se volimo 2 (1989)
Hajde da se volimo 3 (1990)

Documentary
Lepa Brena: Godine Slatkog greha (2017)

Television
Në orët e vona (1982)
Jugovizija (1983)
Kamiondžije 2 (1983)
Jugovizija (1986)
Obraz uz obraz: Novogodišnji special (1991) - TV film
Novogodišnji show program sa Lepom Brenom (2002)
Kursadžije (2007) - TV show; one episode role
Mahalaši (2009) - Bosnian TV series; special guest star
Veče sa Lepom Brenom (2014) - TV show
Paparazzi (2017) - Bulgarian TV show

Tours and concerts

Tours
Great Yugoslav Tour (1983)
Great Yugoslav Tour '84 (1984)
Uđi slobodno Tour (2008–11)
Začarani krug Tour (2011–17)
Zar je važno da l' se peva ili pjeva... World Tour (2017–22)

Residency concerts
Lepa Brena Live at Dom sindikata (1987)

Other
Dark Scene Records released in 2009 Dark Tribute to Lepa Brena, an electronic/rock album where 20 different artists interpret 20 of her songs.

References

External links

	
	
	
	
	

 
1960 births
Living people
Serbian turbo-folk singers
Serbian folk-pop singers
21st-century Serbian women singers
Yugoslav women singers
Musicians from Tuzla
People from Brčko District
Singers from Belgrade
Grand Production artists
Bosnia and Herzegovina emigrants to Serbia
20th-century Serbian women singers